Shadow of Suspicion is a 1944 American comedy crime film directed by William Beaudine and starring Marjorie Weaver, Peter Cookson and Tim Ryan.

Main cast
 Marjorie Weaver as Claire Winter  
 Peter Cookson as Jimmy Dale 
 Tim Ryan as Everett G. Northrup  
 Pierre Watkin as Frank J. Randall  
 Clara Blandick as Mother Randall  
 J. Farrell MacDonald as Police Captain Mike Dolan  
 John Hamilton as Mr. R.M. Cartell  
 Tom Herbert as Holman  
 Anthony Warde as Bill Randall  
 George J. Lewis as Paul Randall  
 Frank J. Scannell as Red Randall  
 Ralph Lewis as Steve Randall

References

Bibliography
 Marshall, Wendy L. William Beaudine: From Silents to Television. Scarecrow Press, 2005.

External links
 

1944 films
1940s crime comedy films
1940s English-language films
American crime comedy films
Films directed by William Beaudine
Monogram Pictures films
American black-and-white films
1944 comedy films
1940s American films